In American pimp culture, a bottom girl, bottom woman, or bottom bitch is a term for a prostitute who sits atop the hierarchy of prostitutes working for a particular pimp. A bottom bitch is usually the prostitute who has been with the pimp the longest and consistently makes the most money. Being the bottom bitch gives the prostitute status and power over the other women working for her pimp; however, the bottom bitch also bears many responsibilities. 

In U.S. v. Pipkins, the Eleventh Circuit described the bottom bitch's duties as "work[ing] the track in [her pimp's] stead, running interference for and collecting money from the pimp's other prostitutes, [and] look[ing] after the pimp's affairs if the pimp was out of town, incarcerated, or otherwise unavailable." Similarly, the Training Manual of the Hawaiian Prostitution Intervention Program explains that the bottom bitch's obligations may include handling finances, and training and recruiting other prostitutes.

See also

 Bitch (insult)
 Basic bitches

References 

Prostitutes by type
Gendered occupations